Armagomphus armiger is a species of dragonfly of the family Gomphidae, 
known as an armourtail. 
It is the only known species of the monotypic genus Armagomphus.

Armagomphus armiger is endemic to south-western Australia, where it inhabits streams and rivers.
It is a small dragonfly with black and yellow markings.

Gallery

See also
 List of Odonata species of Australia

References

Gomphidae
Odonata of Australia
Endemic fauna of Australia
Taxa named by Robert John Tillyard
Insects described in 1913